Aly Doerfel (26 September 1949 – 23 May 2021) was a Luxembourgian fencer. He competed in the team épée event at the 1972 Summer Olympics.

References

External links
 

1949 births
2021 deaths
Sportspeople from Luxembourg City
Luxembourgian male épée fencers
Olympic fencers of Luxembourg
Fencers at the 1972 Summer Olympics